Come to Milton Keynes is a single released by the Style Council in 1985. It was the second single from the band's second studio album, Our Favourite Shop, and charted at number 23 in the UK singles chart.

Background
The title refers to Milton Keynes, a new town established in 1967, midway between London and Birmingham. In an interview given at the time of the song's release, Paul Weller stated that the song was inspired by the "Red Balloon" Milton Keynes advert, which was produced on behalf of the Milton Keynes Development Corporation.

Critical Reception
Paul Weller biographer John Reed argues in Paul Weller: My Ever Changing Moods (1996) that:
The song’s lyrics suggested a reality of drugs, violence, and ‘losing our way’ behind a façade of ‘luscious houses ‘ where the ‘curtains are drawn’, the idea being to create a musical pastiche which matched the supposed artificiality of Milton Keynes itself.
More recently, Thomas McLean has called the song "a missing link between the Kinks’ “Village Green Preservation Society” and Blur’s “Country House”," and "a dark commentary on one of the last of the new towns."

References

The Style Council songs
1985 songs
Songs written by Paul Weller
Polydor Records singles